Henry Manners Cavendish, 3rd Baron Waterpark (8 November 1793 – 31 March 1863), was a British nobleman and Whig politician.

Waterpark was the son of Richard Cavendish, 2nd Baron Waterpark, and his wife Juliana (née Cooper). He succeeded his father in the barony in 1830 but as this was an Irish peerage it did not entitle him to an automatic seat in the House of Lords. The same year he was instead elected to the House of Commons as one of two representatives for Knaresborough, a seat he held until 1832, and then sat for Derbyshire South from 1832 to 1835. He served as a Lord-in-waiting between 1846 and 1852, and again from 1853 to 1858. He returned to the House of Commons in 1854 when he was elected for Lichfield, and sat for this constituency until 1856. Between 1859 and 1861 he was a Lord of the Bedchamber to Albert, Prince Consort. Waterpark was also a Colonel in the Derbyshire Militia. He was the lieutenant-colonel of the King's Own Staffordshire Militia until he resigned in June 1832.

Lord Waterpark married the Hon. Eliza Jane, daughter of Thomas Anson, 1st Viscount Anson, in 1837. He died in March 1863, aged 69, and was succeeded in the barony by his son, Henry. Lady Waterpark, who was a Member of the Royal Order of Victoria and Albert, died in September 1894.

References 

 Kidd, Charles, Williamson, David (editors). Debrett's Peerage and Baronetage (1990 edition). New York: St Martin's Press, 1990.

External links 

1793 births
1863 deaths
Barons in the Peerage of Ireland
British Militia officers
Henry Cavendish, 03rd Baron Waterpark
Members of the Parliament of the United Kingdom for constituencies in Derbyshire
Whig (British political party) MPs for English constituencies
19th-century Anglo-Irish people
Whig (British political party) Lords-in-Waiting
UK MPs 1830–1831
UK MPs 1831–1832
UK MPs 1832–1835
UK MPs 1852–1857
UK MPs who inherited peerages
People from Derbyshire